Dog-gone Sauce is a gourmet  hot sauce company in Fort Myers, Florida that was created to donate proceeds to local and national Animal Shelters and several local Humane Societies.

History
Dog-gone Sauce Company was created by Jeff Schmidt.  Schmidt used his experience in the supermarket industry and involvement in a hot sauce company with a friend to create the company, intending to donate the profits to animal shelters. He first began with two sauces, Smoky Sweet BBQ Sauce and Chipotle Hot Sauce and later added two additional sauces, Pineapple Honey Hot Sauce and Honey Rum Hot Sauce.

The bottles of Dog-gone Sauce have an adage on the label "Dog-gone Sauce will donate 100% of the after tax profits. Every animal deserves a loving home."

Sauce

The following varieties of Dog-gone Sauce are produced:
Honey Rum Hot Sauce
Chipotle Hot Sauce
Pineapple Honey Hot Sauce
Smoky Sweet BBQ Sauce

References

External links 
 
Sauce spices up shelter funds-Fort Myers News-Press
And they help our four legged friends too-Oshawa Ogre's Views, News & BBQ's

Hot sauces
Brand name condiments
Condiment companies of the United States